James Cane may refer to:

Jame Cane (politician) for Ratoath (Parliament of Ireland constituency)
James Cane (art director) on List of awards and nominations received by Hill Street Blues

See also
James Cayne, businessman
James Cain (disambiguation)
James Caine (disambiguation)
James Caan (disambiguation)
James Kane (disambiguation)